Xavier Colin Bartlett (born 17 December 1998) is an Australian cricketer. He made his List A cricket debut for National Performance Squad against India A on 27 August 2016. A right-arm fast-medium bowler and a right-handed batsman, he lives in Queensland.

Early life
Bartlett was born in Adelaide, South Australia, but moved with his family to the Gold Coast, Queensland, in 2005 at the age of seven. He began playing junior cricket for Surfers Paradise and made his first grade debut for the Gold Coast Dolphins in November 2015 at the age of 17. Bartlett graduated from The Southport School in 2016 as a member of Radcliffe House. While at the school, he represented the school's First XI cricket team in both 2015 and 2016; winning the Westcott Family Trophy for First XI bowler of the year alongside teammate Jack McDonald and played a pivotal role in TSS's 2015 First XI GPS Premiership winning season.

Domestic career
He made his first-class cricket debut on 18 October 2019, for Queensland in the 2019–20 Sheffield Shield season. He made his Twenty20 debut on 11 December 2020, for the Brisbane Heat, in the 2020–21 Big Bash League season. In just his second Big Bash League game, Bartlett took three wickets against the Adelaide Strikers.

International career
In December 2017, he was named in Australia's squad for the 2018 Under-19 Cricket World Cup.

References

External links

1998 births
Living people
Australian cricketers
Sportspeople from the Gold Coast, Queensland
Cricketers from Queensland
People educated at the Southport School
Cricket Australia XI cricketers
Brisbane Heat cricketers
Queensland cricketers